San Pedro Bay is a bay in southern Chile located in the southern coast of Osorno Province. In 1965 the ships Janequeo and Leucoton sank in the bay. The bay has the form of a half-circle open to the west and has several small coves.

On September 18, 1544 twelve men of the expedition of Juan Bautista Pastene made landfall in San Pedro Bay, southern Chile, with Jerónimo de Alderete claiming the territory for the Governor of Chile and the King of Spain. The landfall was likely in what is today known as Caleta Guayusca. The Spanish captured two male and two female indigenous inhabitants as proof of their discovery. Thereafter, on the same day, the expedition sat sail to the north. The site Futawillimapu.org refers to this event as the beginning of the winka invasion.

See also
Bahía Mansa
Maullín River

References

Bays of Chile
Bodies of water of Los Lagos Region
Coasts of Los Lagos Region